Nocardiopsis salina  is a halophilic bacterium from the genus of Nocardiopsis which has been isolated from hypersaline soil in the Xinjiang Province in China.

References

Further reading

External links
Type strain of Nocardiopsis salina at BacDive -  the Bacterial Diversity Metadatabase	

Actinomycetales
Bacteria described in 2004